Nesodden is a municipality in Akershus in Viken county, Norway.  It is part of the traditional region of Follo.  The administrative centre of the municipality is Nesoddtangen.  The parish of Næsodden was established as a municipality on 1 January 1838 (see formannskapsdistrikt). The new municipality of Oppegård was separated from Nesodden on 1 July 1915.

General information

Name 
The name (Old Norse: Nesoddi) is an old district name.  The first element is nes which means "headland" and the last element is (the definite form of) odde which means "point".

The very tip of the peninsula is called Nesoddtangen, where the last element is (the definite form of) tange which means "spit". In fact, all three elements in this name have (nearly) the same meaning, so it can be translated roughly as peninsula-peninsula-peninsula.

Nesodden Church

Nesodden Church (Nesodden kirke) is located in Nesodden parish in Follo rural deanery. The Medieval,  Romanesque church is situated southeast of the village of Nesodden. The building material is stone and brick. It was built in 1175. It has a rectangular nave and lower, narrower choir.  The church is of long plan and has 130 seats. In the church, there is a Renaissance pulpit from about 1600 decorated with paintings of Jesus and the four Evangelists.  The altarpiece from 1715 was carved by Johan Jørgen Schram with a motif showing Jesus in Gethsemane. Domenico Erdmann conducted restoration during 1920. The baptismal font made in clay stone and dates from the Middle Ages.

The church was renovated several times between the 17th and the 20th centuries.  The chancel was extended in 1714. The church was most recently restored between 1956 and 1960, both times under the direction of architect Ragnar Nilsen (1896–1986). The church celebrated its 800th anniversary during 1975.

Sunnaas Hospital
Sunnaas Hospital, founded in 1954 as a nursing home, was authorized as a hospital in 1960, primarily to treat polio patients from Oslo in cooperation with Oslo City Hospital. The hospital is a university hospital today.

Minorities

Geography 
Nesodden is located on the tip of the peninsula between main Oslofjord and its arm Bunnefjorden. It includes the villages Hellvik, Fjellstrand, Bjørnemyr, Nesoddtangen, and Fagerstrand, which is also the name of a reality show that was filmed on Fagerstrand and aired on TV 2 during the first half of 2005. Nesoddtangen has passenger ferry connections to Lysaker in Bærum (8 min) and Aker Brygge in Oslo (23 min).

Coat of arms 
The coat of arms is designed by the architect Christian Doxrud (1917–2002) and authorized 12 December 1986.  The coat of arms shows a silver triangle on a blue background as a canting of the geographical position of the municipality, which is situated on a peninsula in the Oslofjord.

Notable residents 
Several notable Norwegians live in Nesodden.
 scientists:  professor, archeologist Christian Keller, professor em. neuroanatomist Terje Lømo and med. professor Johan Stanghelle
 politicians: Jan Balstad, Gunnar Garbo, Christian Hintze Holm, Dagfinn Høybråten,  Rikke Lind and Nina Sandberg
 polar explorer: Børge Ousland
 athletes: Aleksander Fjeld Andersen and Stig Roar Husby
 actors:  Gard B. Eidsvold, Pål Sverre Valheim Hagen, Espen Klouman Høiner, Jørgen Langhelle, Hildegunn Riise,  Bjørn Sundquist and Stein Winge,
 authors: Olav Njølstad, Hanne Ørstavik,  Øystein Rakkenes and Aksel Sandemose
 painters: Ulf Kristiansen, Wenche Øyen, Per Kleiva, Helge Revold and cartoonist Roar Hagen 
 musicians/singers/songwriters: John Bevan, Geir Johnson, Rune Kristoffersen, Sondre Lerche, Madden, Trine Rein, Alexander Rybak, Satyr (Sigurd Wongraven) and Per Øystein Sørensen
 news presenters: Bjørn Hansen
 comedian: Åsleik Engmark
 models: Helene Rask, Anette Stai

and
 former residents: politicians Kåre Kristiansen, Reiulf Steen, Kjell Magne Bondevik and Tora Aasland; lawyer Arne Haugestad, musician Thomas "Happy-Tom" Seltzer and terrorist Anders Cameroon Østensvig Dale

See also
Hellvik (Nesodden)

References

Related reading
Kristensen, Tom (1975)  Nesodden kirke, et gammelt hus (Nesodden kommune / Aschehoug forlag)

External links 
 
 
 Municipal fact sheet from Statistics Norway
 

 
Municipalities of Akershus
Municipalities of Viken (county)
Peninsulas of Viken